Masatomo Takeuchi (born 29 September 1952) is a Japanese weightlifter. He competed in the men's flyweight event at the 1976 Summer Olympics.

References

1952 births
Living people
Japanese male weightlifters
Olympic weightlifters of Japan
Weightlifters at the 1976 Summer Olympics
Place of birth missing (living people)
Medalists at the 1974 Asian Games
Asian Games bronze medalists for Japan
Weightlifters at the 1974 Asian Games
Asian Games medalists in weightlifting
20th-century Japanese people
21st-century Japanese people